The Legislature XIII of Italy lasted from 9 May 1996 until 29 May 2001. Its composition was the one resulting from the general election of 21 April 1996. The election was called by President Scalfaro after the technocratic government of Lamberto Dini lost its support in the Parliament in 1995. President Scalfaro dissolved the houses of Parliament on 16 February 1996. The legislature ended after completing its five-year-long natural course, when President Ciampi dissolved the houses on 8 March 2001.

Government

Composition

Chamber of Deputies 

The number of elected deputies is 630. At the end of the legislature, eight seats remained vacant making the final total number of deputies 622. For these seats no by-election was planned, since they were left vacant less than a year before the natural end of the legislature.

 President: Luciano Violante (PDS), elected on 16 May 1996
 Vice Presidents: Lorenzo Acquarone (L'Ulivo), Pierluigi Petrini (Mixed), Alfredo Biondi (FI), Carlo Giovanardi (Mixed)

Senate of the Republic 

The number of elected senators is 315. At the beginning of the legislature there were 10 life senators (Giovanni Leone and Francesco Cossiga as former Presidents, and the nominated life senators Amintore Fanfani, Leo Valiani, Carlo Bo, Norberto Bobbio, Gianni Agnelli, Giulio Andreotti, Francesco De Martino and Paolo Emilio Taviani). After the deaths of Fanfani and Valiani, and the appointment of Scalfaro as life senator after the election of President Ciampi on 15 May 1999, the final number of life senators was of nine.

The total number of senators at the start of the legislature was of 325. At the end of it, two seats remained vacant because no by-elections could be held for vacancies appearing less than one year before the natural end of the legislature. Therefore, the total number of senators at the end of the legislature was of 322.

 President: Nicola Mancino (PPI), elected on 16 May 1996
 Vice Presidents: Carlo Rognoni (SD – L'Ulivo), Ersilia Salvato (PRC, then PDS), Domenico Constestabile (FI), Domenico Fisichella (AN)

Note

 Of the 315 elected senators, 10 Senators for life were added at the beginning of the term distributed as follows:
 4 from the group Partito Popolare Italiano: Giulio Andreotti (nel 2001 passato al gruppo Democrazia Europea), Carlo Bo, Amintore Fanfani (died in 1999), Paolo Emilio Taviani.
 2 from the group Sinistra Democratica – L'Ulivo: Norberto Bobbio, Francesco De Martino.
 4 with no affiliation: Gianni Agnelli, Francesco Cossiga, Giovanni Leone, Leo Valiani (died in 1999). Nel 1999 Oscar Luigi Scalfaro.

References

Legislatures of Italy
1996 establishments in Italy
2001 disestablishments in Italy